Abramovka is a rural locality (a selo) in Perevolotsky District, Orenburg Oblast, Russia. The population was 292 as of 2014. There are 9 streets.

Geography 
Abramovka is located 31 km north of Perevolotsky (the district's administrative centre) by road. Yapryntsevo is the nearest rural locality.

References 

Rural localities in Orenburg Oblast